Spirit Lake is a natural lake in Kingsbury County, South Dakota, in the United States. The lake is seven miles north of De Smet and US Route 14 and six miles east of Bancroft. The smaller Mud Lake lies just to the southeast.

The lake received its name either due to the area being an Indian burial ground, or a transfer from Spirit Lake, Iowa.

See also
List of lakes in South Dakota

References

Lakes of South Dakota
Lakes of Kingsbury County, South Dakota